The Phoenix Party was a short-lived left-wing political party in New Zealand.

It was founded by Gerald Williams, formerly an organiser for the Labour Party. During Norman Kirk's leadership of Labour (1965–1974), Williams came to disagree with a number of Labour Party policies, particularly over the policy of giving state funding to church schools. Believing that the Labour Party was becoming moribund, Williams founded the Phonenix Party. The name is an allusion to the mythical Phoenix, representing Williams' hope that the party would "rise from the ashes" of the Labour Party.

Williams was the party's only candidate, and attracted a certain number of protest votes. In the 1969 elections, he contested the Dunedin Central electorate, placing fourth (with 365 votes). He continued to criticise the Labour Party by means of satire. Williams later became a member of the Values Party, the world's first national-level environmentalist political party.

Defunct political parties in New Zealand